Pardes Publishing is an independent Israeli publishing house founded by David Gottesmann in 2000 and located in the city of Haifa, Israel. Pardes publishes fiction, non-fiction and poetry in Hebrew, Arabic and English. Notable writers include Tamar Gozansky, Stephen Fulder, and Asaf Hanuka.

References

External links
Pardes Publishing – official website.

Book publishing companies of Israel
Publishing companies established in 2000